Grange Mills is a very small area of east Balham in the London Borough of Lambeth, England. Rarely appearing on maps, it is essentially little more than a small industrial estate, located off Weir Road (formerly Grove Road).

References

Areas of London
Districts of the London Borough of Lambeth